Sophia Moestrup (born 1964) is a Danish political scientist and scholar, who is the deputy director for Central and West Africa at the National Democratic Institute (NDI), since November 2005. Previously, she worked for the United Nations Industrial Development Organization (UNIDO) in Cameroon from 1991 to 1994, was a country representative of Danida in Niger from July 1994 to July 1997, a consultant for the Academy for Educational Development during 2004 and a social development consultant at the World Bank from November 2004 to November 2005, authoring a number of chapters for the World Bank's Social Accountability Sourcebook. Moestrup holds B.A and M.A degrees in Economics from the University of Copenhagen, and a Ph.D. in political science from the George Washington University. Her published work is mainly focused on constitutional developments, democratization and semi-presidentialism. She is a regular contributor to the Presidential Power blog on presidential politics in Francophone West Africa.

With Robert Elgie she is the editor of Semi-presidentialism outside Europe: A comparative study (Routledge, 2007), Semi-Presidentialism in Central and Eastern Europe (Manchester University Press, 2008), Semi-Presidentialism and Democracy (Palgrave Macmillan, 2011; also with Yu-Shan Wu) and Semi-Presidentialism in the Caucasus and Central Asia (Palgrave Macmillan, 2016).

References

External links
 Academia.edu profile (alternate)
 
 

1964 births
Living people
University of Copenhagen alumni
Danish economists
Danish women economists
Columbian College of Arts and Sciences alumni
Danish political scientists
Danish scholars
World Bank people
Women political scientists